Rugby league is a team sport played in South Africa. There has been three dynasties of rugby league in South Africa that attempted to establish a thriving rugby league. Not all attempts were in the interest of South Africans; rather an interest in financial windfall. Others took to the townships and promoted the league at the grass roots, which saw some of the most successful periods of rugby league in South Africa. The game has changed over 50 years of involvement in South Africa and today is played by a small number of teams in 3 competitions, the Rhino Cup, Protea Cup and Western Province Rugby League which is administered by the South African Rugby League.

The National Team

The South African national rugby league team is called the Rhinos.  In addition to the national team, a representative team of South Africans living in the United Kingdom was formed in 2004 called the Wild Dogs (now defunct).

History

Rugby league in South Africa has a long and turbulent history, consisting of no less than three administrations over 40 years that attempted to establish the game of rugby league in South Africa. None, certainly the earlier attempts, were very successful.

The first attempted expansion of the code into South Africa was primarily put together by the English and encouraged by the French for the purpose of expanding the game into new nations, that would inevitably bring more tests to the English and French shores, ensuring a lucrative future. At least, that was the plan; however it was not to be, the South African public did not take to the sport and the expansion plans were stopped prematurely causing a third scheduled match in London to not be played.

The second attempted expansion was a strange double act in the 1960s consisting of two separate factions, known as the National Rugby League and South African Rugby League. Each fought for their own survival until the RLIF laid down the law that saw the NRL effectively shut down and its clubs moved to the SARL. All was looking good for SARL until a South African representative team toured Australia and were embarrassingly beaten.

In 1991 the South African Rugby Football League was established to promote amateur rugby league.

1998's World Club Challenge between the British and Australian champions was mooted as a showpiece fixture at Ellis Park in Johannesburg. However this didn't eventuate.

From 2009 there were three South Africans playing in Australia, Jarrod Saffy who plays for the St. George Illawarra Dragons, Allan Heldsinger who plays for the Redcliffe Dolphins,and Willie Bloem who played for the Canberra Raiders. In 2010 the Sydney Roosters have signed South African rugby union junior JP Du Plessis. The NRL plan to sign more South Africans in the future.

So far the Sydney Roosters have signed four South African rugby union players and Peter O'Sullivan stated he will bring them all on a bus back to Bondi the Melbourne Storm have also recruited players from the country.

In 2011 a host of changes were implemented by the remaining clubs, the first of which was to elect a representative board and establish a Commercial Entity to take the sport forward. The result is a new National Club Championship as well as several international tours next year. The South African Senior Side also played in the Rugby League World Cup Qualifier in 2011 and will hope to build in 2012 towards a strong showing in the 2012 and 2013 international seasons.

The South African Students will be competing in the Rugby League Students World Cup in July 2013 in England.

National Club Competition
There are currently three competitions in South Africa, the Rhino Cup, the first division, consisting of 4 teams, the Protea Cup, the second division, consisting of 8 and the Western Province Rugby League, the third division, consisting of 8 teams.

The competition started in 2009 with only four teams from all provinces, with the Ermelo Tomahawks winning. In 2010 and 2011, the Rhino Cup was held with the Middelburg Tigers and the TUKS Reds coming out the victors. In 2012, there was no Cups held, instead, there were derby matches on different provinces; Western Cape, Mpumalanga, and Gauteng. In 2013, the Rhino Cup was reinstated and the Protea Cup and the Western Cape Cup was added as well. The TUKS Rugby League took the Rhino and Protea Cups in the 2013-14 season.

References

External links